Clinidium curvicosta is a species of ground beetle in the subfamily Rhysodinae. It was described by Louis Alexandre Auguste Chevrolat in 1873. It is endemic to the Sierra Maestra in Cuba.

Clinidium curvicosta measure  in length.

References

Clinidium
Beetles of North America
Insects of Cuba
Endemic fauna of Cuba
Beetles described in 1873
Taxa named by Louis Alexandre Auguste Chevrolat